Ernest Edwin D Walker (24 November 1889 – 1958) was an English footballer who played in the Football League for Leicester City.

References

1889 births
1958 deaths
English footballers
Association football forwards
English Football League players
Holwell Sports F.C. players
Hinckley United F.C. players
Leicester City F.C. players